Baldwin of Alna  ( or Alva;  died in 1243) was Pope Gregory IX envoy  and later Papal legate in Baltic region.
 He participated in both Northern Crusades and crusades to the East.

History 
Baldwin was monk of the  Cistercian Aulne Abbey monastery in Bishopric of Liège.
Baldwin was Pope Pope Gregory IX envoy in Archbishopric of Riga  with the task to settle disagreements arising after the death of Bishop Albert von Buxhövden between the Bishop's seat and Livonian Brothers of the Sword.  Baldwin resolved the dispute in favor of the Riga Dome Council and confirmed nomination of bishop Nikolaus von Nauen to Archbishopric of Riga seat.

Baldwin also attempted to create a Pontifical States (also  "papal rule") from the various Baltic and Prussian regions. This led to an even greater divide between the knights and the bishop's seat. In addition, disagreements arose with Curonians and Semigallians. Balduin made a trip back to Rome where the Pope named him  Papal legate of the Turning Areas of the Baltic Sea. When he returned to the Baltic in 1233, the German nobility of Reval rose up against him. There was a civil war in which Livonian Brothers of the Sword defeated Baldwin's supporters. Baldwin himself was forced to seek refuge in his Cistercian Order brothers Daugavgrīva Abbey.
In 1234 Pope recalled Baldwin back to Rome and sent instead his new envoy William of Modena.

In 1239, Baldwin accompanied Baudouin de Courtenay in Barons' Crusade and took over the responsibilities of the archbishop of Vizia in Thrace, Latin Empire, in the present Turkey territory between Adrianople and Constantinople.

See also 
Christian of Oliva

References 

Livonian Confederation
Diplomats of the Holy See
Belgian Roman Catholic clergy
Cistercians
Christians of the Livonian Crusade
Christians of the Barons' Crusade
1243 deaths